Mount Thompson is a mountain in Brisbane, Queensland, Australia. It is within the suburbs of Mount Gravatt East and Holland Park.

It is well-known within Brisbane because Queensland's first crematorium (and only crematorium until the 1970s), Mount Thompson crematorium, was built on its north-west slope in 1934.

References

Thompson
Geography of Brisbane
Holland Park, Queensland